The Office for Strategic Coordination of Health Research (OSCHR) is a UK NHS body designed "to facilitate more efficient translation of health research into health and economic benefits in the UK through better coordination of health research and more coherent funding arrangements to support translation."

As of September 2020, the body had 15 members, including CMOUK Chris Whitty, the Scottish Chief Scientist for Health David Crossman, Jennifer Rubin of ESRC, and Fiona Watt of MRC.

References

National Health Service
Public bodies and task forces of the United Kingdom government